A superpipe is a large halfpipe structure used in extreme sports such as snowboarding, freestyle skiing, skateboarding, scooters, freestyle BMX and vert skating.

Overview
Other features of a superpipe are that the width of the pipe is greater than the height of the walls, and the walls extend to near vertical.

The term superpipe has evolved over the years as the size of halfpipes has grown. Originally,  halfpipes were known as superpipes, but during the early 2000s, major competition organizers listened to rider feedback and began constructing 22' halfpipes for competitions.  These became known as superpipes, and the 18' halfpipes they replaced are now known as standard halfpipes. The 22' wall size has proved very popular with athletes.

All halfpipes require extensive grooming by specialized equipment. In contrast, a natural snow halfpipe can be cleaned by a normal snow groomer.
Because of the high expense of constructing and maintaining them, there are not that many halfpipes in the world, and very few true superpipes. During the 2013–2014 northern-hemisphere winter, only fourteen 22' superpipes existed globally.

References

Aggressive skating
Freestyle skiing
Roller skating
Skateboarding equipment
Snowboarding
Sports venues by type